Built for Speed is a compilation album by American rockabilly band Stray Cats, released as the band's first album in the United States in June 1982 by EMI America Records.

Built for Speed is essentially a compilation of 12 tracks taken from the band's first two British album releases: six from Stray Cats (February 1981) and five from Gonna Ball (November 1981), plus the title track, "Built for Speed", which had not previously been released in the United Kingdom.

It was the most successful record for the band, earning a platinum certification from the Recording Industry Association of America, and with the music videos for songs such as "Rock This Town" and "Stray Cat Strut" reaching MTV regular rotation status.

Critical reception

Reviewing Built for Speed for The Village Voice, music critic Robert Christgau said that, despite Brian Setzer's exotic, modernistic guitar touches, "the mild vocals just ain't rockabilly. You know how it is when white boys strive for authenticity—'57 V-8 my ass". Rolling Stones David Fricke found Stray Cats' self-production "spiritless" and their original compositions "mostly average", remarking that the band only "gets it dead right" on the tracks produced by Dave Edmunds.

In a retrospective review, Mark Deming of AllMusic wrote that the melodies and playing are strong enough to withstand datedness on what is "song-for-song the group's strongest album, despite the cut-and-paste manner in which it was created".

Track listing

Note: "Jeanie, Jeanie, Jeanie" is often miscredited as having been written by Mike Chapman, who recorded a song of the same name with his band Tangerine Peel. However, Chapman's "Jeanie, Jeanie, Jeanie" is a completely different song from the one the Stray Cats recorded; they just happen to share the same title. The Stray Cats' "Jeanie, Jeanie, Jeanie" was originally performed by Eddie Cochran, and was written by George Motola and Ricky Page (regardless of what the original Built for Speed album or other various Stray Cats collections may claim).

Personnel
Credits are adapted from the album's liner notes.

Stray Cats
 Brian Setzer – guitars, lap steel guitar, vocals
 Slim Jim Phantom – drums, vocals
 Lee Rocker – bass, electric bass, vocals

Production
 Dave Edmunds – production
 Hein Hoven – production
 Stray Cats – production
 Wally Traugott – mastering

Design
 Charles Novick Studios – design
 Gavin Cochrane – front cover photography
 Francesca – design
 Guido Harari – back cover photography
 Sheila Rock – back cover photography

Charts

Album

Single

Certifications

References

1982 albums
Stray Cats albums
EMI America Records albums
Albums produced by Dave Edmunds